K221 or K-221 may refer to:

K-221 (Kansas highway), a former state highway in Kansas
HMS Chelmer (K221), a former UK Royal Navy ship